The USASA Region III National Cup took place between April 27 and April 29, 2012, and acted as a qualifying tournament for the 2012 U.S. Open Cup with each group winner securing a place in the Open Cup. The tournament took place at the Houston Amateur Sports Park in Houston, Texas.

Group stage

Group A

Group B

Advancing to Open Cup
 ASC New Stars
 NTX Rayados

References

2012 U.S. Open Cup
2012
2012